The University of Santo Tomas in Manila, Philippines has 22 colleges and 3 secondary school departments. The colleges are interdependent academic constituents of the university that offer undergraduate and graduate programs. Historically, the colleges are named as Faculty, College, Institute, School, or Conservatory. There are 19 colleges that offer civil courses and 3 faculties that also offer ecclesiastical programs. 

The Faculties of Ecclesiastical Studies, though governed by its particular statutes, is still an integral part of the university.

A dean heads a faculty, college, or school. He is assisted by a faculty council and an assistant dean. All academic units are also supervised by a Dominican regent. In a faculty, college or school where the dean is a member of the Order of Preachers, the dean also functions as the regent. A director heads an institute.

Founded in 2017, the Graduate School of Law is the newest unit in the University.

Types of college
Colleges that were founded with the university in 1611 up until the beginning of the twentieth century uses the title of Faculty. This is an accordance with statutes of the medieval University of Salamanca and the Royal and Pontifical University of Mexico which used "facultad" for their constituent colleges. Various faculties on grammar, humanities, arts, and sciences existed in the early years of the university. These faculties evolved to become the present colleges, like the College of Science and the College of Fine Arts and Design. The Faculty of Sacred Theology, Faculty of Philosophy, and the Faculty of Canon Law, which are housed in the Faculties of Ecclesiastical Studies, are considered to be the oldest faculties in the university. The Faculty of Civil Law, founded in 1734, is usually dubbed as the "oldest lay faculty", while the Faculty of Engineering, founded in 1907, is regarded as the "youngest faculty". The term faculty is only historical and does not signify dominance over the "newer" colleges. UST is the only university in the Philippines that uses faculty.

College is used by independent degree-granting units that were founded since the American period in the 1920s until the present time. The College of Education, founded in 1926, is often called to be the "oldest college".

A department under a certain academic unit, which is being developed to become an independent entity, is given the title Institute. An Institute may also be established in the university as an organically independent body, like the Institute of Physical Education and Athletics. In 1974, the Institute of Physical Therapy was founded and was supervised by the College of Science and the Faculty of Medicine and Surgery. The institute was granted a full autonomy in 1993 and became independent in 2000. In 2006, the Institute of Tourism and Hospitality Management was founded from the College of Education. It became an independent college in 2008. The Institute of Information and Computing Sciences (IICS) was established in 2014 from the Faculty of Engineering. In 2021, the IICS was elevated to the status of a College. Though referred to as an "Institute", the Institute of Religion does not confer undergraduate or graduate programs. It is a department that supervises the theology classes in the lay colleges.

School was earlier used by the School of Civil Engineering, School of Architecture and Fine Arts, School of Commerce, School of Nursing, and the defunct Normal School. Only the Graduate School uses the style today.

Conservatory is used by the University's music school, the Conservatory of Music. It offers complete bachelor's degrees in music.

Academic units

Present colleges
Below is the list of the present academic units of the university.

Defunct colleges
 Faculty of Liberal Arts - 1611
 Faculty of Morals, Sacred Scripture & Liturgy - 1825
 School of Drawing and Painting - 1865
 College of Notaries - 1875
 School of Matrons/Midwifery - founded in 1879. It is the first academic unit to that accepted women.
 School of Ministering Surgeons - 1880
 School of Pharmacy for the Practitioner - 1880
 Faculty of Sciences - 1896
 Facultad de Carreras Especiales 
 College of Dentistry - 1904
 College of Liberal Arts - founded in 1926. The college was reorganised to become two separate colleges of the Faculty of Arts and Letters and College of Science in 1964.
 Normal School - founded in 1940, merged with the College of Education in 1971.
 Institute of Nutrition - founded in 1970. It formed as an independent body from the College of Education. It eventually closed in the 1980s.
 Institute of Technological Courses - 1972

Secondary Education

Renamed and separated colleges
In 1896, the Faculty of Philosophy and Letters was founded. It became the Faculty of Arts and Letters when part of the programs of the College of Liberal Arts were merged with it. The programs of the College of Liberal Arts leading to Bachelor of Science degrees where reorganised to become the College of Science. The College of Science retained the college color and seal of the College of Liberal Arts.

The Faculty of Medicine and Surgery and the Faculty of Pharmacy were both founded in 1871 as the Facultad de Medicina y Farmacia and separated in 1901 to become two different faculties.

The College of Commerce and Business Administration had several name changes. It was first called as the School of Commerce in 1933. Later on, it developed to become the College of Commerce in 1934, College of Commerce and Accountancy in 1988, and eventually to its present name. The Institute of Tourism and Hospitality Management became the College of Tourism and Hospitality Management in 2008.

The College of Fine Arts and the Conservatory of Music were originally part of the College of Architecture and Fine Arts. The Department of Fine Arts separated from the College of Architecture and became the College of Fine Arts in 2000. The Institute of Physical Therapy was renamed as the College of Rehabilitation Sciences in 2001.

The Alfredo M. Velayo College of Accountancy became an independent college from the College of Commerce and Accountancy in 2004. It was also the first college of the university to be named after an alumnus.

Roll call
In university events, like the Thomasian Welcome Walk and The Sending-off rights, the roll call of the university colleges is done according to their foundation year instead of the usual alphabetical order. Founded in 1611, the Faculty of Sacred Theology is called and introduced first. Being the youngest, founded in 2014, the Institute of Information and Computing Sciences is called last.

The Thomasian, the university website, USTET application forms, and most official publications follow the same way of presenting the colleges.

References

Colleges